This list of governors of Katanga includes governors or equivalent officeholders of the Katanga Province established in the Belgian Congo in 1910, and of successor provinces up to 29 October 2015, when Katanga was split into the provinces of Haut-Katanga, Haut-Lomami, Lualaba and Tanganyika.

On 1 October 1933 the original province of Katanga was renamed Elisabethville/Elisabethstad. 
The district of Lomami was transferred at this time to the new province of Lusambo (later named Kasaï), which had been formed from parts of the old Congo-Kasaï province.
The province returned to the name of Katanga on 27 May 1947.

On 11 July 1960, a few days after the Congo Republic had gained independence, the province of Katanga seceded as an independent state.
In November 1961 the northern portion was reconquered by the national government and made the province of Nord-Katanga.
On 21 January 1963 the remainder of Katanga was reconquered and divided into the provinces of Lualaba and Katanga Oriental.

Nord-Katanga, Lualaba and Katanga Oriental were merged back into the province of Katanga on 28 December 1966.
The province was renamed Shaba on 2 January 1972, then returned to the name of Katanga in 1997.

Governors of Katanga / Elisabethville (1891–1960)

The governors (or equivalent) of Katanga province, renamed Elisabethville/Elisabethstad Province from 1 October 1933 to 27 May 1947, were:

Governors of successor state and provinces (1960–1966)

Independent Katanga (1960–1963)

The rule of the independent state of Katanga were:

Nord-Katanga (1961–1966)

The governors (or equivalent) of the province of Nord-Katanga were:

Lualaba (1963–1966)

The governors (or equivalent) of the province of Lualaba were:

Katanga Oriental (1963–1966)

The governors (or equivalent) of the province of Katanga Oriental were:

Governors of Katanga / Shaba (1966–2015)

The governors (or equivalent) of the province of Katanga, renamed Shaba Province on 2 January 1972, then returned to the name of Katanga in 1997 were:

See also

Lists of provincial governors of the Democratic Republic of the Congo

References

Governors of provinces of the Democratic Republic of the Congo